Waldkappel is a small town in the Werra-Meißner-Kreis district in northern Hesse, Germany.

Geography

Location
Waldkappel is located between Hessisch Lichtenau in the west and Eschwege in the east in the North Hesse Upland between the Meißner-Kaufunger Wald Nature Park neighbouring it to the north and the Stölzinger Gebirge (range) in the south, in the Wehre valley.

Neighbouring communities
Waldkappel borders in the north on the community of Meißner, in the east on the community of Wehretal, in the south on the town of Sontra (all three in the Werra-Meißner-Kreis), in the southwest on the community of Cornberg and the town of Rotenburg an der Fulda (both in Hersfeld-Rotenburg) and in the west on the towns of Spangenberg (in the Schwalm-Eder-Kreis) and Hessisch Lichtenau (in the Werra-Meißner-Kreis).

Constituent communities
Waldkappel consists of 15 districts (Ger.: Stadtteile), namely its administrative centre Waldkappel as well as Bischhausen, Burghofen, Eltmannsee, Friemen, Gehau, Harmuthsachsen, Hasselbach, Hetzerode, Kirchhosbach, Mäckelsdorf, Rechtebach, Rodebach, Schemmern and Stolzhausen.

History

Waldkappel was first officially mentioned in 1226 and was granted town rights in 1414.

The town experienced its economic heyday in the Late Middle Ages from lying on the old trade road durch die langen Hessen, which ran from the Wetterau to Thuringia and on to Leipzig. Bearing witness to the town’s earlier, wealthier times is a Late Gothic church standing in the middle of the community.

The Thirty Years' War put an abrupt end to Waldkappel’s prosperity; the town could never again reach its former importance.

In the course of municipal reform, the communities of Waldkappel, Bischhausen, Burghofen, Friemen, Gehau, Kirchhosbach, Mäckelsdorf, Rechtebach, Rodebach and Schemmern from the former Eschwege district merged. They were joined by Harmuthsachsen and Hasselbach from the former Witzenhausen district, as well as by Stolzhausen from the Melsungen district. In 1974, the greater community reached its full extent with the amalgamation of Eltmannsee and Hetzerode.

Politics

Town council

The municipal election held on 26 March 2006 yielded the following results:

Town partnerships
 Carhaix, Finistère, France
 Rijnwoude, South Holland, Netherlands

Economy and infrastructure

Transport
Through Waldkappel runs Bundesstraße 7. The Autobahn A 44 (Kassel–Eisenach) is under construction.

Famous people
 Peter Griess (1829–1888), industrial chemist, born in Kirchhosbach
 Christian Schütz (1526–1592), Evangelical theologian

References

Werra-Meißner-Kreis